Warner Bros. International Television Production (WBITVP) is the global television production arm of Warner Bros. Television Group.

The division was formed in 2009 to produce original programming or local adaptations of Warner Bros. formats in non-U.S. territories.

The company has also acquired numerous production companies including Shed Media in the United Kingdom and BlazHoffski Holding B.V. (including Dahl TV and BlazHoffSki Levy Productions) in the Netherlands and Belgium. In 2014, the company acquired Netherlands-based Eyeworks and its global subsidiaries outside North America in a US$270 million deal, giving Warner Bros. businesses in 15 new territories.

Warner Bros. International Television Distribution
Warner Bros. International Television Distribution was founded in 1989 after purchasing of Lorimar Telepictures by Warner Communications. It distributes Warner Bros., HBO and Turner content to the international television marketplace (broadcast, pay cable, basic cable, satellite, pay-per-view, subscription video-on-demand, digital platforms, etc.).

Global divisions

Australia 
Warner Bros. International Television Production Australia (WBITPA) was founded in 2004 as Eyeworks Australia before being rebranded in 2014.

As Eyeworks Australia, shows produced include Celebrity Splash, Being Lara Bingle, Gangs of Oz and Territory Cops. Following the rebrand, WBITPA began producing The Bachelor Australia from its fourth season, spin-offs The Bachelorette Australia from its second season & Bachelor in Paradise, as well as First Dates, the eighth season of Who Do You Think You Are?, Back in Time for Dinner, the sixteenth season of Dancing with the Stars and The Masked Singer Australia.

New Zealand 
WBITVP New Zealand produces some of New Zealand’s most successful entertainment shows including RuPaul's Drag Race Down Under, The Bachelor NZ, The Bachelorette NZ, The Block NZ, Celebrity Treasure Island, Glow Up, House of Drag and The Great Kiwi Bake Off.

Factual and documentary productions include Lost and Found, David Lomas Investigates,  All or Nothing: New Zealand All Blacks and Heaven and Hell - The Centrepoint Story.

Spain 
The Spanish subsidiary was acquired as part of the Eyeworks takeover in 2014. Eyeworks España was renamed Warner Bros. International Television Production España in December 2015.

Along with Mediaset España and Netflix, the company also co-produced Brigada Costa del Sol.

United Kingdom 

Established as Shed Productions in 1998, the company was acquired by Time Warner in 2010, before being rebranded as Warner Bros. Television Productions UK in June 2014 (which was later renamed as Warner Bros. Television Studios UK in 2020).

References

External links 
 
 Warner Bros TV Production Australia

Mass media companies established in 2009
Warner Bros. divisions
Television production companies of the United Kingdom
International
Television shows remade overseas